Isabel Miranda de Wallace (née María Isabel Miranda Torres; born May 27, 1951 in Mexico City) is a Mexican educator and social activist. She has served as president of the civil association "Alto al Secuestro" (Stop Kidnapping), and received the National Human Rights Award 2010 from the President of Mexico, Felipe Calderón. She was a candidate of the National Action Party in the 2012 Federal District of Mexico head of government election.

Her coming to power and political status was promoted through the fabrication of evidence and testimonies about the false kidnapping and murder of her son Hugo Alberto Miranda, with the help of the anti-kidnapping prosecution led by Blanco Cabrera.

References

1951 births
Mexican educators
Mexican activists
Mexican women activists
Living people
People from Mexico City